Maggie Lindsy Haberman (born October 30, 1973) is an American journalist, a White House correspondent for The New York Times, and a political analyst for CNN. She previously worked as a political reporter for the New York Post, the New York Daily News, and Politico. She wrote about Donald Trump for those publications and rose to prominence covering his campaign, presidency, and post-presidency for the Times. In 2022, she published the best-selling book Confidence Man: The Making of Donald Trump and the Breaking of America.

Early life
Haberman was born on October 30, 1973, in New York City, the daughter of Clyde Haberman, who became a longtime journalist for The New York Times, and Nancy Haberman (née Spies), a media communications executive at Rubenstein Associates. At that firm, a "publicity powerhouse" whose eponymous founder has been called "the dean of damage control" by Rudy Giuliani, Haberman's mother worked for a client list of influential New Yorkers including Donald Trump. She is a 1991 graduate of Ethical Culture Fieldston School, followed by Sarah Lawrence College where she obtained a bachelor's degree in 1995.

Career
Haberman's career began in 1996 when she was hired by the New York Post. In 1999, the Post assigned her to cover City Hall, where she became "hooked" on political reporting. Haberman worked for the Posts rival newspaper, the New York Daily News, for three and a half years in the early 2000s, where she continued to cover City Hall. Haberman returned to the Post to cover the 2008 U.S. presidential campaign and other political races. In 2010, Haberman was hired by Politico as a senior reporter. She became a political analyst for CNN in 2014.

Haberman was hired by The New York Times in early 2015 as a political correspondent for the 2016 U.S. presidential campaign. According to one commentator, Haberman "formed a potent journalistic tag team with Glenn Thrush".

Her reporting style as a member of the White House staff of the Times features in the Liz Garbus documentary series The Fourth Estate.

According to an analysis by British digital strategist Rob Blackie, Haberman was one of the most commonly followed political writers among Biden administration staff on Twitter.

Reporting on Trump 
Haberman frequently broke news about the Trump campaign and administration. In March 2016 Haberman, along with New York Times reporter David E. Sanger, questioned Trump in an interview, "Donald Trump Expounds on His Foreign Policy Views," during which he "agreed with a suggestion that his ideas might be summed up as 'America First'".

In October 2016, one month before Donald Trump defeated Hillary Clinton in the US presidential election, a stolen document released by WikiLeaks outlined how Clinton's campaign could induce Haberman to place sympathetic stories in Politico. However, contrary to the hopes of her campaign, subsequent stories by Haberman about Clinton were much more critical of her than they had hoped for. Haberman was criticized for applying a double standard in her reporting about the scandals involving the two presidential candidates of the 2016 election. Haberman and The New York Times supposedly disproportionately covered Hillary Clinton's email controversy with many more articles critical of her than of the numerous scandals involving her competitor Donald Trump, including his sexual misconduct allegations, with Taylor Link writing: "The NYT's White House reporter calls the Clinton campaign liars, but was hesitant to use that word with Trump."

She has been credited with becoming "the highest-profile reporter" to cover Trump's campaign and presidency, as well as "the most-cited journalist in the Mueller report". She has also been accused "from certain corners of the left as a supposed water carrier for the 45th president".

In 2022, Haberman published a book on the Trump presidency called Confidence Man: The Making of Donald Trump and the Breaking of America. In advance of its release, CNN published an excerpt that revealed that Trump planned to simply remain in the White House after his November 2020 election loss. A Guardian review of the book describes her as "the New York Times' Trump whisperer", and describes the book as "much more than 600 pages of context, scoop and drama....it gives Trump and those close to him plenty of voice – and rope." The book debuted at number one on The New York Times nonfiction best-seller list for the week ending October 8, 2022.

Awards and honors 
In 2018, Haberman's reporting on the Trump administration earned the Pulitzer Prize for National Reporting (shared with colleagues at the Times and The Washington Post), the individual Aldo Beckman Award for Journalistic Excellence award from the White House Correspondents' Association, and the Front Page Award for Journalist of the Year from the Newswomen's Club of New York.

Criticism 
In January 2020, attorneys representing Nick Sandmann announced that Haberman was one of many media personalities they were suing for defamation for her coverage of the 2019 Lincoln Memorial Confrontation.

Journalists and authors criticized Haberman for allegedly choosing to withhold information about Donald Trump for the sake of her book, despite being aware of it ahead of the January 6 United States Capitol attack, although they presented no evidence of when she had learned of Trump's statements.

Personal life
Haberman married Dareh Ardashes Gregorian, a reporter for the New York Daily News, formerly of the New York Post, and son of Vartan Gregorian, in a November 2003 ceremony at the Tribeca Rooftop in Manhattan. They have three children and live in Brooklyn.

Bibliography

See also
 New Yorkers in journalism

References

External links

 
 

1973 births
20th-century American journalists
21st-century American journalists
American political journalists
American women journalists
CNN people
Ethical Culture Fieldston School alumni
Jewish American journalists
Living people
New York Daily News people
New York Post people
The New York Times Pulitzer Prize winners
The New York Times writers
Pulitzer Prize for National Reporting winners
Sarah Lawrence College alumni
Writers from Brooklyn
20th-century American women writers
21st-century American women writers